A goddess is a female deity. In many known cultures, goddesses are often linked with literal or metaphorical pregnancy or imagined feminine roles associated with how women and girls are perceived or expected to behave. This includes themes of spinning, weaving, beauty, love, sexuality, motherhood, domesticity, creativity, and fertility (exemplified by the ancient mother goddess cult). Many major goddesses are also associated with magic, war, strategy, hunting, farming, wisdom, fate, earth, sky, power, laws, justice, and more. Some themes, such as discord or disease, which are considered negative within their cultural contexts also are found associated with some goddesses. There are as many differently described and understood goddesses as there are male, shapeshifting, or neuter gods.

In some faiths, a sacred female figure holds a central place in religious prayer and worship. For example, Shaktism, the worship of the female force that animates the world, is one of the three major sects of Hinduism.

Polytheist religions, including Polytheistic reconstructionists, honor multiple goddesses and gods, and usually view them as discrete, separate beings. These deities may be part of a pantheon, or different regions may have tutelary deities.

Etymology
The noun goddess is a secondary formation, combining the Germanic god with the Latinate -ess suffix. It first appeared in Middle English, from about 1350. The English word follows the linguistic precedent of a number of languages—including Egyptian, Classical Greek, and several Semitic languages—that add a feminine ending to the language's word for god.

Historical polytheism

Ancient Near East

Mesopotamia

Inanna was the most worshipped goddess in ancient Sumer. She was later syncretised with the East Semitic goddess Ishtar. Other Mesopotamian goddesses include Ninhursag, Ninlil, Antu and Gaga.

Ancient Africa (Egypt)

 Goddesses of the Ennead of Heliopolis: Tefnut, Nut, Nephthys, Isis
 Goddesses of the Ogdoad of Hermopolis: Naunet, Amaunet, Kauket, Hauhet; originally a cult of Hathor
  Satis and Anuket of the triad of Elephantine

Canaan

Goddesses of the Canaanite religion: Ba`alat Gebal, Astarte, Anat.

Anatolia
 Cybele: Her Hittite name was Kubaba, but her name changed to Cybele in Phrygian and Roman culture. Her effect can be also seen on Artemis as the Lady of Ephesus.
 Hebat: Mother Goddess of the Hittite pantheon and wife of the leader sky god, Teshub. She was the origin of the Hurrian cult.
 Arinniti: Hittite Goddess of the sun. She became patron of the Hittite Empire and monarchy.
 Leto: A mother Goddess figure in Lykia. She was also the main goddess of the capital city of Lykia League (Letoon)

Pre-Islamic Arabia
In pre-Islamic Mecca the goddesses Uzza, Manāt and al-Lāt were known as "the daughters of god". Uzzā was worshipped by the Nabataeans, who equated her with the Graeco-Roman goddesses Aphrodite, Urania, Venus and Caelestis. Each of the three goddesses had a separate shrine near Mecca. Uzzā, was called upon for protection by the pre-Islamic Quraysh. "In 624 at the battle called "Uhud", the war cry of the Qurayshites was, "O people of Uzzā, people of Hubal!" (Tawil 1993).

According to Ibn Ishaq's controversial account of the Satanic Verses (q.v.), these verses had previously endorsed them as intercessors for Muslims, but were abrogated. Most Muslim scholars have regarded the story as historically implausible, while opinion is divided among western scholars such as Leone Caetani and John Burton, who argue against, and William Muir and William Montgomery Watt, who argue for its plausibility.

The Quran (Q53:19-31) warns of the vanity of trusting to the intercession of female deities, in particular "the daughters of god".

Indo-European traditions

Pre-Christian and pre-Islamic goddesses in cultures that spoke Indo-European languages.

Indian

 Ushas: is the main goddess of the Rigveda and is the goddess of the dawn. 
 Prithivi: the Earth, also appears as a goddess. Rivers are also deified as goddesses. 
 Agneya: or Aagneya is the Hindu Goddess of Fire. 
 Varuni: is the Hindu Goddess of Water. Bhumi, Janani, Buvana, and Prithvi are names of the Hindu Goddess of Earth.

Iranian
 Anahita: or Anahit, or Nahid, or Arədvī Sūrā Anāhitā, or Aban: the divinity of "the Waters" and hence associated with fertility, healing, beauty and wisdom.
 Daena: a divinity, counted among the yazatas, representing insight and revelation, hence "conscience" or "religion".
 Spenta Armaiti: or Sandaramet, one of the Amesha Spentas, a female divinity associated with earth and Mother Nature. She is also associated with the female virtue of devotion (to family, husband, and child). In the Iranian calendar, her name is on the twelfth month and also the fifth day of the month.
 Ashi: a divinity of fertility and fortune in the Zoroastrian hierarchy of yazatas.

Greco-Roman

 Eleusinian Mysteries: Baubo (goddess of mirth), Demeter (goddess of the harvest) and Persephone (goddess of spring and the queen of the Underworld as the wife of Hades).
 Greek muses: Calliope (goddess of epic poetry), Clio (history), Erato (love poetry), Euterpe (music, song, and lyric poetry), Melpomene (tragedy), Polyhymnia (sacred poetry), Terpsichore (dance), Thalia (comedy and pastoral poetry), and Urania (astronomy).
 Aphrodite: Goddess of love and beauty.
 Artemis: Virgin goddess of the wilderness, childbirth and the hunt.
 Athena: Virgin goddess of wisdom, crafts, strategy, and warfare.
 Eris: Goddess of chaos.
 Gaia: Primordial goddess of the Earth. Most gods descend from her.
 Hecate: Goddess of sorcery and crossroads. Often considered a chthonic or lunar goddess. She is either portrayed as a single goddess or a triple goddess (maiden, mother, crone).
 Hera: Goddess of marriage and the queen of Olympus as the wife of Zeus.
 Hestia: Virgin goddess of the hearth, domesticity and family.
 Iris: Goddess of rainbows.
 Nike: Goddess of victory. She is predominantly pictured with Zeus or Athena and sometimes Ares.
 Selene: Titan goddess of the Moon.
 Rhea: Titan goddess of motherhood.

Celtic

Goddesses and Otherworldly Women in Celtic polytheism include:
 Celtic antiquity: Brigantia
 Gallo-Roman goddesses: Epona, Dea Matrona
 Irish mythology: Áine, Boann, Brigid, The Cailleach, Danu, Ériu, Fand and The Morrígan (Nemain, Macha, and Badb) among others.  
 
The Celts honoured goddesses of nature and natural forces, as well as those connected with skills and professions such as healing, warfare and poetry. The Celtic goddesses have diverse qualities such as abundance, creation and beauty, as well as harshness, slaughter and vengeance. They have been depicted as beautiful or hideous, old hags or young women, and at times may transform their appearance from one state to another, or into their associated creatures such as crows, cows, wolves or eels, to name but a few. In Irish mythology in particular, tutelary goddesses are often associated with sovereignty and various features of the land, notably mountains, rivers, forests and holy wells.

Germanic

Surviving accounts of Germanic mythology and Norse mythology contain numerous tales of female goddesses, giantesses, and divine female figures in their scriptures. The Germanic peoples had altars erected to the "Mothers and Matrons" and held celebrations specific to these goddesses (such as the Anglo-Saxon "Mothers-night"). Various other female deities are attested among the Germanic peoples, such as Nerthus attested in an early account of the Germanic peoples, Ēostre attested among the pagan Anglo-Saxons, and Sinthgunt attested among the pagan continental Germanic peoples. Examples of goddesses attested in Norse mythology include Frigg (wife of Odin, and the Anglo-Saxon version of whom is namesake of the modern English weekday Friday), Skaði (one time wife of Njörðr), Njerda (Scandinavian name of Nerthus), that also was married to Njörðr during Bronze Age, Freyja (wife of Óðr), Sif (wife of Thor), Gerðr (wife of Freyr), and personifications such as Jörð (earth), Sól (the sun), and Nótt (night). Female deities also play heavily into the Norse concept of death, where half of those slain in battle enter Freyja's field Fólkvangr, Hel's realm of the same name, and Rán who receives those who die at sea. Other female deities such as the valkyries, the norns, and the dísir are associated with a Germanic concept of fate (Old Norse Ørlög, Old English Wyrd), and celebrations were held in their honour, such as the Dísablót and Disting.

Pre-Columbian America

Aztec

 Chalchiuhtlicue: goddess of water (rivers, seas, storms, etc.)
 Chantico: goddess of the hearth, flames
 Coyolxauhqui: warrior goddess associated with the moon
 Duality Earth Goddesses: Cihuacoatl (childbirth and maternal death), Coatlicue (earth as the womb and grave), Tlazolteotl (filth and purification)
 Itzpapalotl: monstrous ruler of Tamoanchan (a paradise realm)
 Mictecacihuatl: queen of Mictlan (the underworld)
 Xochiquetzal: goddess of fertility, beauty, and female sexuality

Other
The Inca pantheon included: Pachamama, the supreme Mother Earth, Mama Killa, a moon goddess, and Mama Ocllo, a fertility goddess.

The main goddesses in the Maya pantheon were Ixchel, a mother goddess, and the Maya moon goddess. The Goddess I presided over eroticism, human procreation, and marriage. Ixtab was the goddess of suicide.

Neopaganism

Most Modern Pagan traditions honour one or more goddesses. While some who follow Wicca believe in a duotheistic belief system, consisting of a single goddess and a single god, who in hieros gamos represent a united whole, others recognise only one or more goddesses.

Wicca

In Wicca "the Goddess" is a deity of prime importance, along with her consort the Horned God.
Within many forms of Wicca the Goddess has come to be considered as a universal deity, more in line with her description in the Charge of the Goddess, a key Wiccan text. In this guise she is the "Queen of Heaven", similar to Isis. She also encompasses and conceives all life, much like Gaia. Similarly to Isis and certain late Classical conceptions of Selene, she is the summation of all other goddesses, who represent her different names and aspects across the different cultures. The Goddess is often portrayed with strong lunar symbolism, drawing on various cultures and deities such as Diana, Hecate, and Isis, and is often depicted as the Maiden, Mother, and Crone triad popularised by Robert Graves (see Triple Goddess below). Many depictions of her also draw strongly on Celtic goddesses. Some Wiccans believe there are many goddesses, and in some forms of Wicca, notably Dianic Wicca, the Goddess alone is worshipped, and the God plays very little part in their worship and ritual.

Goddesses or demi-goddesses appear in sets of three in a number of ancient European pagan mythologies; these include the Greek Erinyes (Furies) and Moirai (Fates); the Norse Norns; Brighid and her two sisters, also called Brighid, from Irish or Celtic mythology.

Robert Graves popularised the triad of "Maiden" (or "Virgin"), "Mother" and "Crone", and while this idea did not rest on sound scholarship, his poetic inspiration has gained a tenacious hold. Considerable variation in the precise conceptions of these figures exists, as typically occurs in Neopaganism and indeed in pagan religions in general. Some choose to interpret them as three stages in a woman's life, separated by menarche and menopause. Others find this too biologically based and rigid, and prefer a freer interpretation, with the Maiden as birth (independent, self-centred, seeking), the Mother as giving birth (interrelated, compassionate nurturing, creating), and the Crone as death and renewal (holistic, remote, unknowable) — and all three erotic and wise.

Folk religion and animism

African religions

In African and African diasporic religions, goddesses are often syncretised with Marian devotion, as in Ezili Dantor (Black Madonna of Częstochowa) and Erzulie Freda (Mater Dolorosa). There is also Buk, an Ethiopian goddess still worshipped in the southern regions. She represents the fertile aspect of women. So when a woman is having her period not only does it signify her submission to nature but also her union with the goddess.  Another Ethiopian goddess is Atete, the goddess of spring and fertility. Farmers traditionally leave some of their products at the end of each harvesting season as an offering while women sing traditional songs.

A rare example of henotheism focused on a single Goddess is found among the Southern Nuba of Sudan. The Nuba conceive of the creator Goddess as the "Great Mother" who gave birth to earth and to mankind.

Chinese folk religion

 Mazu is the goddess of the sea who protects fishermen and sailors, widely worshipped in the south-eastern coastal areas of China and neighbouring areas in Southeast Asia.
 The Goddess Weaver Zhinü, daughter of the Celestial Mother, wove the stars and their light, known as "the Silver River" (what Westerners call "The Milky Way Galaxy"), for heaven and earth. She was identified with the star Westerners know as Vega.

Shinto
Goddess Amaterasu is the chief among the Shinto gods, while there are important female deities Ame-no-Uzume-no-Mikoto, Inari and Konohanasakuya-hime.

Hinduism

Hinduism is a complex of various belief systems that sees many gods and goddesses as being representative of and/or emanative from a single source, Brahman, understood either as a formless, infinite, impersonal monad in the Advaita tradition or as a dual god in the form of Lakshmi-Vishnu, Radha-Krishna, Shiva-Shakti in Dvaita traditions. Shaktas, worshippers of the Goddess, equate this god with Devi, the Mother Goddess. Such aspects of one god as male god (Shaktiman) and female energy (Shakti), working as a pair are often envisioned as male gods and their wives or consorts and provide many analogues between passive male ground and dynamic female energy.

For example, Brahma pairs with Sarasvati. Shiva likewise pairs with Parvati who later is represented through a number of Avatars (incarnations): Sati and the warrior figures, Durga and Kali. All goddesses in Hinduism are sometimes grouped together as the great goddess, Devi.

The Shaktis took a further step. Their ideology, based mainly on tantras, sees Shakti as the principle of energy through which all divinity functions, thus showing the masculine as depending on the feminine. In the great shakta scripture known as the Devi Mahatmya, all the goddesses are aspects of one presiding female force—one in truth and many in expression—giving the world and the cosmos the galvanic energy for motion. It expresses through philosophical tracts and metaphor, that the potentiality of masculine being is actuated by the feminine divine. More recently, the Indian author Rajesh Talwar has critiqued Western religion and written eloquently on the sacred feminine in the context of the North Indian Goddess Vaishno Devi.

Local deities of different village regions in India were often identified with "mainstream" Hindu deities, a process that has been called Sanskritisation. Others attribute it to the influence of monism or Advaita, which discounts polytheist or monotheist categorisation.

While the monist forces have led to a fusion between some of the goddesses (108 names are common for many goddesses), centrifugal forces have also resulted in new goddesses and rituals gaining ascendance among the laity in different parts of Hindu world. Thus, the immensely popular goddess Durga was a pre-Vedic goddess who was later fused with Parvati, a process that can be traced through texts such as Kalika Purana (10th century), Durgabhaktitarangini (Vidyapati 15th century), Chandimangal (16th century) etc.

Widely celebrated Hindu festival Navaratri is in the honour of the divine feminine Devi (Durga) and spans nine nights of prayer in the autumn, also referred as Sharada Navratri.

Abrahamic religions

Judaism

According to Zohar, Lilith is the name of Adam's first wife, who was created at the same time as Adam. She left Adam and refused to return to the Garden of Eden after she mated with archangel Samael. Her story was greatly developed during the Middle Ages in the tradition of Aggadic midrashim, the Zohar and Jewish mysticism.

The Zohar tradition has influenced Jewish folklore, which postulates God created Adam to marry a woman named Lilith. Outside of Jewish tradition, Lilith was associated with the Mother Goddess, Inanna – later known as both Ishtar and Asherah. In The Epic of Gilgamesh, Gilgamesh was said to have destroyed a tree that was in a sacred grove dedicated to the goddess Ishtar/Inanna/Asherah. Lilith ran into the wilderness in despair. She then is depicted in the Talmud and Kabbalah as first wife to God's first creation of man, Adam. In time, as stated in the Old Testament, the Hebrew followers continued to worship "False Idols", like Asherah, as being as powerful as God. Jeremiah speaks of his (and God's) displeasure at this behavior to the Hebrew people about the worship of the goddess in the Old Testament. Lilith is banished from Adam and God's presence when she is discovered to be a "demon" and Eve becomes Adam's wife.

The following female deities are mentioned in prominent Hebrew texts:
 Agrat bat Mahlat
 Anath
 Asherah
 Ashima
 Astarte
 Eisheth

Christianity

The veneration of Mary, the mother of Jesus, as an especially privileged saint has continued since the beginning of the Catholic faith. Mary is venerated as the Mother of God, Queen of Heaven, Mother of the Church, the Blessed Virgin Mary, Star of the Sea, and other lofty titles.

Marian devotion similar to this kind is also found in Eastern Orthodoxy and sometimes in Anglicanism, although not in the majority of denominations of Protestantism.
In some Christian traditions (like the Orthodox tradition), Sophia is the personification of either divine wisdom (or of an archangel) that takes female form. She is mentioned in the first chapter of the Book of Proverbs. Sophia is identified by some as the wisdom imparting Holy Spirit of the Christian Trinity, whose names in Hebrew—Ruach and Shekhinah—are both feminine, and whose symbol of the dove was commonly associated in the Ancient Near East with the figure of the Mother Goddess.

In mysticism, Gnosticism, as well as some Hellenistic religions, there is a female spirit or goddess named Sophia who is said to embody wisdom and who is sometimes described as a virgin. In Roman Catholic mysticism, Saint Hildegard celebrated Sophia as a cosmic figure both in her writing and art. Within the Protestant tradition in England, the 17th-century mystic universalist and founder of the Philadelphian Society Jane Leade wrote copious descriptions of her visions and dialogues with the "Virgin Sophia" who, she said, revealed to her the spiritual workings of the universe. Leade was hugely influenced by the theosophical writings of 16th-century German Christian mystic Jakob Böhme, who also speaks of Sophia in works such as The Way to Christ. Jakob Böhme was very influential to a number of Christian mystics and religious leaders, including George Rapp and the Harmony Society.

Latter Day Saint movement 
The members of most denominations in the Latter Day Saint movement believe in, although they do not directly worship, a Heavenly Mother who is the female counterpart of the Heavenly Father. Together they are referred to as Heavenly Parents. Adherents also believe that all humans, both women and men, have the potential to become gods through a process known as exaltation.

Feminism

Goddess movement

At least since first-wave feminism in the United States, there has been interest in analyzing religion to see if and how doctrines and practices treat women unfairly, as in Elizabeth Cady Stanton's The Woman's Bible. Again in second-wave feminism in the U.S., as well as in many European and other countries, religion became the focus of some feminist analysis in Judaism, Christianity, and other religions, and some women turned to ancient goddess religions as an alternative to Abrahamic religions (Womanspirit Rising 1979; Weaving the Visions 1989). Today both women and men continue to be involved in the Goddess movement (Christ 1997). The popularity of organisations such as the Fellowship of Isis attest to the continuing growth of the religion of the Goddess throughout the world.

While much of the attempt at gender equity in mainstream Christianity (Judaism never recognised any gender for God) is aimed at reinterpreting scripture and degenderising language used to name and describe the divine (Ruether, 1984; Plaskow, 1991), there are a growing number of people who identify as Christians or Jews who are trying to integrate goddess imagery into their religions (Kien, 2000; Kidd 1996,"Goddess Christians Yahoo Group").

Sacred feminine

The term "sacred feminine" was first coined in the 1970s, in New Age popularisations of the Hindu Shakti. Hinduism also worships multitude of goddesses that have their important role and thus in all came to interest for the New Age, feminist, and lesbian feminist movements.

Metaphorical use
The term "goddess" has also been adapted to poetic and secular use as a complimentary description of a non-mythological woman. The OED notes 1579 as the date of the earliest attestation of such figurative use, in Lauretta the diuine Petrarches Goddesse.

Shakespeare had several of his male characters address female characters as goddesses, including Demetrius to Helena in A Midsummer Night's Dream ("O Helen, goddess, nymph, perfect, divine!"), Berowne to Rosaline in Love's Labour's Lost ("A woman I forswore; but I will prove, Thou being a goddess, I forswore not thee"), and Bertram to Diana in All's Well That Ends Well. Pisanio also compares Imogen to a goddess to describe her composure under duress in Cymbeline.

See also

 Anima (Jung)
 Gavari
 Gender of God
 Goddess movement
 Heavenly Mother
 List of goddesses
 Matriarchy
 Mother goddess
 Ochre
 Oshun
 Sophia
 The Myth of Matriarchal Prehistory
 The White Goddess
 Tree deity
 Venus figurines

References

Further reading
Beavis, Mary Ann and Helen Hye-Sook Hwang (eds). Goddesses in Myth, History and Culture, Mago Books, 2018. 
 Dexter, Miriam Robbins, and Victor Mair (2010). Sacred Display: Divine and Magical Female Figures of Eurasia. Cambria Press.
 Barnhart, Robert K (1995). The Barnhart Concise Dictionary of Etymology: the Origins of American English Words. HarperCollins. 
 Gorshunova . Olga V.(2008), Svjashennye derevja Khodzhi Barora…, ( Sacred Trees of Khodzhi Baror: Phytolatry and the Cult of Female Deity in Central Asia) in Etnoragraficheskoe Obozrenie, n° 1, pp. 71–82. . .
 

Deities
 
Gender and religion
Jungian archetypes
Pantheism